Malesherbia humilis is an annual herb that grows in the subtropics of northern and central Chile to Argentina.

Varieties 
As of 2022, there are three accepted varieties of M. humilis, var. humilis, var. parviflora, var. proqinqua.

Variety humilis was previously classified as Gynopleura dilatata (Walp.). It has the largest range of the varieties, ranging from Norther Chile to Argentina.

Variety parviflora (Phil.) Ricardi differs from var. humilis by its smaller leaves and smaller flowers. It is found in coastal regions and river basins within the Tarapacá, Antofagasta, Atacama, and Coquimbo regions.  It was originally classified as a species, M. parviflora, in 1893, but would reclassified as a variety in 1967.

Variety propinqua (Gay) Ricardi is only found in on the interior semidesert hills in the Coquimbo region. It differs from var. humilis in its larger leaves and larger flowers, which have larger floral cups, sepals, and petals. In 1847 the variety was considered a separate species, M. propinqua, but it would later be demoted to the status of variety in 1897. It is synonymous with var. gabrielae (Ricardi) Gengler.

Previously accepted 
var. gabrielae reclassified as var. propinqua

var. taltalina reclassified as var. parviflora

References 

humilis